KPB may refer to:

 Communist Party of Belarus (Belarusian: Kamunistychnaya Partyia Belarusi)
 Communist Party of Belgium (Dutch: Kommunistische Partij van België)
 Communist Party of Bulgaria (Bulgarian: Komunisticeska Partija na Balgarija)
 Kampung Bandan railway station, Jakarta, Indonesia, station code
 Point Baker Seaplane Base, Alaska, US, IATA and LID codes
 Kamla Persad-Bissessar, former prime minister of Trinidad and Tobago and current opposition leader